Temognatha heros, the Yellow Jewel Beetle or Large Jewel Beetle, is a species of beetles belonging to the family Buprestidae.

Description
It is the biggest within the genus Temognatha. The basic body colour is yellowish-orange, while pronotum is dark reddish. Elytra are punctato-striate. Legs show a metallic blue color.

The adults  feed on the flowers of various trees and shrubs (especially Eucalyptus leptophylla, Eucalyptus foecunda, Melaleuca pauperiflora and Melaleuca uncinata.

Larvae are wood-borers of Casuarina species, Eucalyptus gracilis, Eucalyptus oleosa, Eucalyptus foecunda and Melaleuca uncinata.

Distribution
This species is present in South and Western Australia (New South Wales and Victoria). These beetles can be found in drainage basins and coastal and oceanic zones.

References

Buprestidae
Woodboring beetles
Beetles described in 1855